Qazim Kokoshi (12 September 1882 - October 1947) was one of the signatories of the Albanian Declaration of Independence.

References

20th-century Albanian politicians
19th-century Albanian politicians
Signatories of the Albanian Declaration of Independence
All-Albanian Congress delegates
1882 births
1947 deaths